Giovanni Battista Sfondrati (died 1647) was a Roman Catholic prelate who served as Bishop of Pavia (1642–1647).

Biography
On 1 Dec 1642, Giovanni Battista Sfondrati was appointed during the papacy of Pope Urban VIII as Bishop of Pavia.
On 14 Dec 1642, he was consecrated bishop by Giulio Roma, Bishop of Tivoli, with Lelio Falconieri, Titular Archbishop of Thebae, and Giovanni Battista Altieri (seniore), Bishop Emeritus of Camerino, serving as co-consecrators. 
He served as Bishop of Pavia until his death in 1647.

References

External links and additional sources
 (for Chronology of Bishops) 
 (for Chronology of Bishops)  

17th-century Italian Roman Catholic bishops
Bishops appointed by Pope Urban VIII
1647 deaths